Zoran Ranković (born 17 December 1969) is a Serbian former professional footballer who played as a striker.

Club career
After showing promising displays for Dinamo Pančevo, Ranković gained more attention for his performances with Obilić. He was the leading scorer of the team that won the 1997–98 First League of FR Yugoslavia. In March 2000, Ranković was transferred to Chinese Jia-A League club Shanghai Shenhua, alongside his teammate Saša Viciknez. He spent two seasons with the team, scoring 21 goals in 42 league appearances. After a brief spell with fellow Jia-A side Beijing Guoan, Ranković returned to his homeland and rejoined his former club Obilić.

In late 2003, Ranković moved to China for the second time and played for Jia-B League club Nanjing Yoyo. He later spent one season with newly promoted First League of Serbia and Montenegro side Hajduk Beograd. In early 2006, Ranković joined Second League club Radnički Pirot led by manager Marjan Živković, his former Obilić teammate. He retired from the game after playing for Kolubara in the Serbian League Belgrade.

International career
Ranković made his international debut for FR Yugoslavia on 25 February 1998, playing 55 minutes in a 3–1 away friendly loss against Argentina.

Honours
Obilić
 First League of FR Yugoslavia: 1997–98
 FR Yugoslavia Cup: Runner-up 1997–98

References

External links
 
 
 
 

Association football forwards
Beijing Guoan F.C. players
Expatriate footballers in China
First League of Serbia and Montenegro players
FK Dinamo Pančevo players
FK Hajduk Beograd players
FK Kolubara players
FK Obilić players
FK Radnički Pirot players
Footballers from Belgrade
Nanjing Yoyo players
Serbia and Montenegro expatriate footballers
Serbia and Montenegro expatriates in China
Serbia and Montenegro footballers
Serbia and Montenegro international footballers
Serbian footballers
Shanghai Shenhua F.C. players
1969 births
Living people